James Munroe Turner (April 23, 1850July 6, 1896) was a Michigan politician.

Early life
James Munroe Turner was born in Lansing, Michigan on April 23, 1850 to parents James Madison Turner and Marian Munroe Turner.

Career
On November 7, 1876, Turner was elected to the Michigan House of Representatives where he represented the Ingham County 1st district from January 3, 1877 to December 31, 1878. In 1888, Turner served as an alternate delegate to the Republican National Convention from Michigan. Later in 1888, Turner served as one of Michigan's presidential electors. In 1889, Turner served as mayor of Lansing. In 1890, Turner was the Republican nominee in the Michigan gubernatorial election. Turner was defeated by Democratic nominee, Edwin B. Winans. In 1895, Turner served as mayor of Lansing again. Turner advocated for the policy of free silver, signing a non-partisan call for the policy in January 1896.

Personal life
On September 20, 1876, James M. Turner married Sophia Scott Porter. Together, they had two children. On November 21, 1888, James became a brother-in-law of fellow state representative Frank L. Dodge when Dodge married James's sister, Abigail Rogers Turner.

Death
Turner died on July 6, 1896 in Lansing. He was interred at Mount Hope Cemetery in Lansing.

See also
Turner-Dodge House

References

External links

1850 births
1896 deaths
Burials in Michigan
Mayors of Lansing, Michigan
1888 United States presidential electors
Republican Party members of the Michigan House of Representatives
Michigan Silverites
19th-century American politicians